Lennon or McCartney is a 2014 Canadian documentary short film directed by Matt Schichter. The film is a compilation of 550 celebrities' responses, taken from interviews throughout the decade, to the question of which of the two former Beatles is superior: John Lennon or Paul McCartney.

Among the celebrities included in the film are the Arctic Monkeys, Benedict Cumberbatch, Bridgit Mendler, Carly Rae Jepsen, Justin Bieber, Metallica, Miss Piggy, Morgan Freeman, Sylvester Stallone, Steve-O, and Tommy Chong. Of the responses, 282 answered "John Lennon", 196 answered "Paul McCartney", 15 answered "George Harrison", four answered "Ringo Starr", one answered "Jimi Hendrix", one answered "Lou Reed", one answered "Keith Richards", one answered "Oasis", and 50 did not answer.

Cast
In order of appearance:
 Aaron Eckhart
 Aaron Paul
 Aasif Mandvi
 Adam Lambert 
 Adam Levine and James Valentine of Maroon 5
 Tom Hamilton of Aerosmith 
 Laura Jane Grace of Against Me
 Mikel Jollett of The Airborne Toxic Event
 Alan Tudyk
 Alana de la Garza 
 Alanis Morissette
 Alex Borstein
 Alice Eve, Karl Urban and John Cho
 Tyson Ritter and Nick Wheeler of The All-American Rejects
 Zachary Porter, Cameron Quiseng and Michael Allen Martinez of Allstar Weekend
 Alison Brie and Danny Pudi 
 Alyssa Reid 
 Amanda Palmer
 Anna Gunn
 Angelique Kidjo
 Angus Wilson
 Alex Turner and Matt Helders of Arctic Monkeys
 Max Kerman and Mike DeAngelis of Arkells
 Tim Wheeler of Ash
 Atom Egoyan
 Aubrey Plaza
 Dan Layus of Augustana
 Mike Robins and Tareya Green of Autumn Hill
 Freddie Mojallal of The Ausumn Portrait
 Scott Avett of The Avett Brothers
 Aaron Bruno of Awolnation
 Robbie Robertson of The Band
 Kimberly Perry, Reid Perry, and Neil Perry of The Band Perry
 Steven Page of Barenaked Ladies
 Barry Pepper
 Basia Bulat
 Dan Smith, Kyle Simmons, Will Farquarson, and Chris Wood of Bastille
 Baz Luhrmann
 Beau Willimon
 Ben E. King
 Ben Howard
 Ben Lee
 Ben Taylor
 Benedict Cumberbatch
 Bethany Cosentino of Best Coast
 Beth Orton
 James Johnstone of Biffy Clyro
 Big Sean
 Gordie Johnson of Big Sugar and Grady
 Ian Thornley of Big Wreck and Thornley
 Ben Kowalewicz and Aaron Solowoniuk of Billy Talent
 Ozzy Osbourne and Geezer Butler of Black Sabbath
 Blake Sennett of Rilo Kiley and The Elected
 Greg Keelor and Jim Cuddy of Blue Rodeo
 Bo Diddley
 Jaret Reddick and Chris Burney of Bowling for Soup
 Brad Furman
 Bradley Cooper, Ed Helms, and Zach Galifianakis
 Brendan Canning of Broken Social Scene
 Brett Dennen
 Brett Kissel
 Bret McKenzie
 Bridget Mendler
 Buck 65
 Josh Todd of Buckcherry
 Butch Walker
 Cadence Weapon
 Brad Schultz of Cage the Elephant
 Caitlin Gerard
 John McCrea of Cake
 Carly Rae Jepsen
 Carrie Underwood
 Casey Wilson
 Cassadee Pope
 Charli XCX
 Donald Glover
 Chloe Bennet
 Chris Jericho
 Chris Pine and Zachary Quinto
 Cillian Murphy and Rodrigo Cortés
 Dallas Green of City & Colour and Alexisonfire
 Classified
 Cobie Smulders and Mark Ruffalo
 Beatrice Martin of Coeur de Pirate
 Adam Duritz of Counting Crows
 Courtney Solomon
 Ian Astbury of The Cult
 Scott Stanton, Dave Lang, Ghosty Boy, and Chris Petersen of Current Swell
 Dan Mangan
 Daniel Wesley
 Danielle Panabaker and Candice Patton
 Danny Boyle
 Darius Rucker of Hootie & the Blowfish
 Justin Hawkins of The Darkness
 David Alan Grier
 David Byrne of Talking Heads
 David Dobkin and Susan Downey
 David Morrissey
 Dr. David Suzuki
 Taylor Goldsmith and Griffin Goldsmith of Dawes
 Dax Shepard
 Chris Walla and Jason McGerr of Death Cab for Cutie
 Devin Kelley
 Martie Maguire and Emily Robison of The Dixie Chicks
 David Draiman and Dan Donegan of Disturbed
 Vincent Neff, David MacLean, Jimmy Dixon, and Tommy Grace of Django Django
 Robby Krieger of The Doors
 Martina Sorbara, Dan Kurtz, and Joel Stouffer of Dragonette
 James Murdoch of The Dungarees
 Joseph Dunwell of The Dunwells
 Dwayne "The Rock" Johnson
 Dylan Bruce
 Ed Sheeran
 Alexander Ebert of Edward Sharpe and the Magnetic Zeros
 Edwin of Crash Karma and I Mother Earth
 Efren Ramirez
 Elle Fanning
 Ellie Goulding
 Emm Gryner
 Emma Thompson and Pierce Brosnan
 Eva Green
 Pete Wentz and Andy Hurley of Fall Out Boy
 Fefe Dobson
 Neil Osbourne of 54-40
 Scott Anderson of Finger Eleven
 Florence Welch of Florence and the Machine
 Tylar Hubbard and Brian Kelley of Florida Georgia Line
 Alex Kapranos and Bob Hardy of Franz Ferdinand
 Joe King, Isaac Slade, Dave Welsh, and Ben Wysocki of The Fray
 Fred Penner
 Scott Hutchison of Frightened Rabbit
 Michael Fitzpatrick of Fitz and the Tantrums
 Nate Ruess of Fun.
 Wade MacNeil of Gallows and Alexisonfire
 Shirley Manson and Duke Erikson of Garbage
 Riki Lindhome of Garfunkel & Oates
 Gary Oldman
 Brian Fallon of The Gaslight Anthem
 Gavin DeGraw
 Gina Gershon
 Eugene Hütz of Gogol Bordello
 Johnny Rzeznik and Robby Takac of Goo Goo Dolls
 Gord Bamford
 Gord Downie of The Tragically Hip
 Gore Verbinski
 Grace Potter
 Alan Doyle of Great Big Sea
 Guiellermo Del Toro
 Ryan Miller of Guster
 Haley Joel Osment and Genesis Rodriguez
 Hannah Georgas
 Taylor Hanson, Zac Hanson, and Isaac Hanson of Hanson
 Hayden
 Jonathan Russell and Josiah Johnson of The Head & The Heart
 Joacob Hoggard and Dave Rosin of Hedley
 David Vertesi, Ashleigh Ball, and David Beckingham of Hey Ocean!
 Tim Baker of Hey Rosetta!
 Pelle Almqvist and Vigilante Carlstroem of The Hives
 Brian Borcherdt, Graham Walsh, Matt McQuaid, and Matt Schulz of Holy Fuck
 Rusty Matyas and Marti Sarbit of Imaginary Cities
 Dan Reynolds and Wayne Sermon of Imagine Dragons
 John Mullane, Glen Nicholson, Brad Goodsell, and Daniel Ledwell of In-Flight Safety
 JD Fortune and Kirk Pengilly of INXS
 Nicholas Thorburn, Evan Gordon, Geordie Gordon, and Adam Halferty of Islands
 Andrew McMahon of Jack's Mannequin and Something Corporate
 Jack McBrayer
 Jack O'Connell and Callan Mulvey
 Jakob Dylan of The Wallflowers
 Jamie Kennedy
 James Blake
 James Franco and Scott Haze
 Dan Haseltine, Stephen Mason, Matt Odmark, and Charlie Lowell of Jars of Clay
 Jarvis Church of The Philosopher Kings
 Jason Bateman and Tina Fey
 Jason Collett
 Jason Priestley
 Jason Mraz
 Jay Malinowski
 Jeff Baena
 Jenny Lewis of Rilo Kiley
 Jeremy Fisher
 Adam Kittredge of Jets Overhead
 Jill Barber
 Jimmy Cliff
 Jim Adkins and Tom Linton of Jimmy Eat World
 J.J. Abrams
 Joel Plaskett
 Jon Middleton of Jon and Roy
 John Cale of The Velvet Underground
 John Lydon of The Sex Pistols
 Jon Huertas
 Jon Reep and Kyle Davis
 Nick Jonas, Joe Jonas, and Kevin Jonas of the Jonas Brothers
 Jordan Gavaris
 Joseph Gordon-Levitt and Rian Johnson
 Joshua Radin
 Josh Ritter
 Johsua Jackson
 Leah Fay of July Talk
 Justin Bieber
 Justin Kirk
 Justin Long
 Justin Nozuka
 Kate Mara
 Kate Nash
 Kathleen Edwards
 Katy Perry
 Kayo
 Tom Chaplin of Keane
 Kelen Coleman
 Kelly Asbury
 Ken Jeong
 Kendrick Lamar
 Kerli
 Kevin Drew of Broken Social Scene
 Kevin Greutert
 Kevin Hart
 Kevin Nealon
 Kevin Smith
 Kevin Spacey
 Brandon Flowers of The Killers
 K-os
 KT Tunstall
 Hillary Scott, Charles Kelley, and Dave Haywood of Lady Antebellum
 Lady GaGa
 Lake Bell
 Andy Brown, Joel Peat, Adam Pitts, and Ryan Fletcher of Lawson
 Lena Headey
 LeVar Burton
 Lights
 Lindi Ortega
 Lindsay Ell
 Lisa Lampanelli
 Lissie
 Stevie Appleby, Dylan Lynch, and Adam O'Regan of Little Green Cars
 LL Cool J
 John Roderick of The Long Winters
 Wesley Schultz of The Lumineers
 Madchild of Swollen Members
 Margaret Cho
 Mark Pellegrino
 Josh Ramsay, Matt Webb, Mike Ayley, and Ian Casselman of Marianas Trench
 Marina Diamandis of Marina and the Diamonds
 Martha Plimpton
 John Wozniak, Dylan Keefe, and Shlomi Lavie of Marcy Playground
 Rob Thomas of Matchbox Twenty
 Matt Rose and Matt Layzell of The Matinee
 Matt Blais
 Matt Costa
 Matt Dusk
 Matt Good
 Matt Mays
 Matt Walsh and Jeremy Sumpter
 Matthew Barber
 Matthew Goode and Allen Leech
 Colin Hay of Men At Work
 Kirk Hammett and Robert Trujillo of Metallica
 Lars Ulrich of Metallica and Nimród Antal
 Jimmy Shaw and Emily Haines of Metric (appear in two segments)
 Andrew VanWyngarden and Benjamin Goldwasser of MGMT
 Michael McGowan
 Mike Tompkins
 Miss Piggy
 Missi Pyle
 Monica Potter
 Mickey Dolenz of The Monkees
 Molly Johnson
 Morgan Freeman
 Ryan Gulldemond of Mother Mother
 Justin Pierre of Motion City Soundtrack
 Vince Neil and Nikki Sixx of Mötley Crüe
 Steve Bays, Hawksley Workman, and Ryan Dahle of Mounties
 Lizzy Plapinger and Max Hershenow of MS MR
 Ben Lovett and Winston Marshall of Mumford & Sons
 Mike Herrera of MxPx
 Gerard Way and Mikey Way of My Chemical Romance
 Matthew Caws of Nada Surf
 Chad Gilbert of New Found Glory
 Jordan Knight and Danny Wood of New Kids on the Block
 Carl Newman and Kathryn Calder of the New Pornographers
 Daniel Victor of Neverending White Lights
 Nick Frost and Edgar Wright
 Chad Kroeger, Mike Kroeger, Daniel Adair, and Ryan Peake of Nickelback
 Nicole Sullivan
 Nikki Williams
 Matthew Healy of The 1975
 Gwen Stefani, Tony Kanal, Tom Dumont, and Adrian Young of No Doubt
 Charlie Fink of Noah and the Whale
 Noel Johnson
 Norman Reedus
 Gem Archer of Oasis
 Oscar Nunez
 Craig Northey of The Odds
 Nanna Bryndís Hilmarsdóttir, Brynjar Leifsson, and Kristján Kristjánsson of Of Monsters and Men
 Damian Kulash and Tim Nordwind of OK Go
 Raine Maida of Our Lady Peace
 Owen Pallett
 Adam Young of Owl City
 Hayley Williams, Taylor York, and Jeremy Davis of Paramore
 Michael Angelakos of Passion Pit
 Patrick Watson
 Paul Bettany
 Pete Townshend of The Who
 Phillip Phillips
 Thomas Mars and Laurent Brancowitz of Phoenix
 Matthew Woodley of Plants and Animals
 Priyanka Chopra
 Psy
 Rod Davis of The Quarrymen
 Marshall Burns of Rah Rah
 Gary LeVox, Jay DeMarcus, and Joe Don Rooney of Rascal Flatts
 Raekwon of Wu-Tang Clan
 Rebecca Hall
 Aaron Barrett and Ryland Steen of Reel Big Fish
 Reno Collier
 Richard J. Lewis
 Rick Springfield
 Tim McIlrath of Rise Against
 Rita Ora
 Rob Zombie and Sheri Moon Zombie
 Robert De Niro and Sylvester Stallone
 Robert Patrick
 Robin Thicke
 Roger Mooking of Bass is Base
 Ron Sexsmith
 Royal Wood
 Russell Peters
 Ben Worcester and Tyler Bancroft of Said the Whale
 Sam Roberts
 Sam Smith
 Sarah Harmer
 Sarah McLachlan
 Sarah Slean
 Sarah Wayne Callies and Arlen Escarpeta
 Scott Waugh
 Scott Weiland of Stone Temple Pilots and Velvet Revolver
 Danny O'Donoghue of The Script
 Selena Gomez
 Serena Ryder
 Jason Ross of Seven Mary Three
 Shad
 Sharon Van Etten
 Shawn Levy
 Shaun Majumder
 Ewan Currie and Ryan Gullen of The Sheepdogs
 Nik Kozub of Shout Out Out Out Out
 Daniel Johns of Silverchair
 Simon Helberg
 Pierre Bouvier, Jeff Stinco, and David Desrosiers of Simple Plan
 Ken Block of Sister Hazel
 Skylar Grey
 Slash of Guns N' Roses and Velvet Revolver
 Chris Murphy and Jay Ferguson of Sloan
 Jonny Quinn of Snow Patrol
 Chris Barron of Spin Doctors
 Aaron Lewis and Mike Mushok of Staind
 Amy Millan of Stars
 Chris Seligman and Pat McGee of Stars
 Stephen Bishop
 Stephen Root
 Steve Byrne
 Steve Jones of the Sex Pistols
 Steve-O
 Roger Hodgson of Supertramp
 Jon Foreman and Tim Foreman of Switchfoot
 Suzie McNeil
 Eddie Reyes of Taking Back Sunday
 Taylor Kitsch
 Jeff Martin of The Tea Party
 Terri Clark
 Tyler Connolly, Dave Brenner, Dean Back, and Joey Dandeneau of Theory of a Deadman
 Nick Hexum of 311
 Adam Gontier and Brad Walst of Three Days Grace
 Tia Carrere
 Tim McGraw
 Tim Reynolds of Dave Matthews Band
 Titus Welliver
 Todd Kerns of Age of Electric
 Todd Phillips
 David Monks, Graham Wright, Josh Hook, and Greg Alsop of Tokyo Police Club
 Tom Odell
 Tommy Chong
 Tony Hale
 Tracy Morgan
 Pat Monahan of Train
 Skinhead Rob of The Transplants
 Colin McDonald and John-Angus McDonald of The Trews
 Vincent D'Onofrio, Vera Farmiga, and Jeremy Strong
 Gordon Gano of Violent Femmes
 Sarah Blackwood of Walk Off the Earth
 Wally Pfister
 Daniel Greaves and Joey Serlin of The Watchmen
 Nathan Williams and Stephen Pope of Wavves
 John K. Samson of The Weakerthans
 Harry McVeigh, Charles Cave, and Jack Lawrence-Brown of White Lies
 Luke Doucet of Whitehorse
 Shaun Verrault of Wide Mouth Mason
 will.i.am of the Black Eyed Peas
 Loel Campbell of Wintersleep
 Chris Ross of Wolfmother
 Gavin Gardiner of The Wooden Sky
 Francois Comtois of Young the Giant
 Jeff Innes, Brandon Scott, and John Jeffrey of Yukon Blonde
 Zach Braff
 Zach Knighton
 Zack Snyder
 Ziggy Marley
 Zoe Saldana
 ZZ Ward

Production
Schichter has stated that "I had all the video footage from the interviews, but never thought about compiling it all until last month ... I just went for it, hoping people would dig it."

References

External links

Link to the video of the documentary on Youtube

2014 short documentary films
2014 films
American short documentary films
Documentary films about the Beatles
2010s English-language films
2010s American films